The Good Guys was a comedy-drama television series, starting on 3 January 1992 and ended on 26 February 1993, that ran for two seasons. Produced by Havahall Pictures (season 2 only) in association with LWT for ITV, it starred Nigel Havers as Guy McFadyean and Keith Barron as Guy Lofthouse.

Cast
Nigel Havers as Guy McFadyean
Keith Barron as Guy Lofthouse

Episodes

Season 1 (1992)

Season 2 (1993)

Trivia
Footage of a young Jack Whitehall is shown during season 1, as the show was produced by his father.

References

External links

ITV television dramas
1992 British television series debuts
1993 British television series endings
1990s British drama television series
ITV comedy
London Weekend Television shows
Television series by ITV Studios
English-language television shows